Made Siamé (1885–1974) was a French stage and film actress.

Selected filmography
 Youth (1933)
 The House on the Dune (1934)
 The Mysteries of Paris (1935)
 The Secret of Polichinelle (1936)
 The Alibi (1937)
 The Benefactor (1942)
 Father Goriot (1945)
 Once is Enough (1946)
 Not So Stupid (1946)
 Captain Blomet (1947)
 Antoine and Antoinette (1947)
 Clear the Ring (1950)
 The Beautiful Image (1951)
 My Friend Oscar (1951)
 Clara de Montargis (1951)
 My Seal and Them (1951)
 My Husband Is Marvelous (1952)
 Operation Magali (1953)

References

Bibliography
 Goble, Alan. The Complete Index to Literary Sources in Film. Walter de Gruyter, 1999.

External links

1885 births
1974 deaths
French film actresses
Actresses from Paris